Tris(trimethylsilyl)methane is the organosilicon compound with the formula (tms)3CH (where tms = (CH3)3Si).  It is a colorless liquid that is highly soluble in hydrocarbon solvents.  Reaction of tris(trimethylsilyl)methane with methyl lithium gives tris(trimethylsilyl)methyllithium, called trisyllithium.  Trisyllithium is useful in Petersen olefination reactions:
(tms)3CH  +  CH3Li  →   (tms)3CLi  +  CH4
(tms)3CLi  +  R2CO  →   (tms)2C=CR2  +  tmsOLi

Trisyllithium is also an effective precursor to bulky ligands.  Some tris(trimethylsilyl)methyl derivatives are far more stable than less substituted derivatives. for example  is a well-behaved tellurol.

See also
 Tris(trimethylsilyl)silane

References

Carbosilanes
Trimethylsilyl compounds